This is a list of the main career statistics of Swedish professional tennis player, Robin Söderling. To date, Söderling has won ten ATP singles titles including one ATP Masters 1000 title at the 2010 BNP Paribas Masters. He was also the runner-up at the French Open in 2009 and 2010 and a semi-finalist at the year-ending ATP World Tour Finals in 2009. Söderling achieved a career high singles ranking of World No. 4 on November 15, 2010.

Söderling remained inactive from July 2011 until his retirement in December 2015. He initially sustained a wrist injury and was later diagnosed with mononucleosis.

Career achievements

In 2009, Söderling made history by becoming the first of two players (the other being Novak Djokovic in 2015) to defeat Rafael Nadal at the French Open. He prevailed in four sets and eventually reached his first grand slam singles final at the event where he lost to then World No. 2 Roger Federer in straight sets, allowing the Swiss to complete a Career Grand Slam in the process. Söderling reached the top ten of the ATP Singles Rankings for the first time in his career later that year and qualified for the year-ending ATP World Tour Finals where he lost in the semi-finals to eventual runner-up, Juan Martín del Potro in three sets. Nonetheless, Söderling finished the year at a then career high of World No. 8.

His good form carried over into 2010 as he reached the semifinals of an ATP Masters 1000 event for the first time at the 2010 BNP Paribas Open where he lost to seventh seed and eventual runner-up Andy Roddick in three sets. In June, Söderling reached his second consecutive final at the French Open, defeating World No. 2 and defending champion Roger Federer for the first time in his career at an ATP level match en route. This win also ended Federer's streak of 23 consecutive semifinal appearances at the grand slams. However, Söderling was not able to cause the same upset he had the previous year, losing to Nadal in straight sets in the final. At the remaining grand slams, Söderling reached the quarterfinals of Wimbledon for the first time in his career where he lost to Nadal in four sets and the quarterfinals of the US Open for the second year in a row where he lost once again to Federer. In November of the same year, Söderling won his first major singles title at the BNP Paribas Masters, defeating Frenchman Gaël Monfils in the final. The win also earned Söderling a new career high singles ranking of World No. 4.

In January 2011, Söderling reached the fourth round of the Australian Open for the first time in his career, but lost to unseeded Ukrainian, Alexandr Dolgopolov in five sets. In February of the same year, Söderling completed a successful title defense for the first time in his career by winning his second consecutive title at the ABN AMRO World Tennis Tournament.

Major Finals

Grand Slam Finals

Singles: 2 (2 runners-up)

ATP Masters 1000 Finals

Singles: 1 (1 title)

ATP career finals

Singles: 20 (10 titles, 10 runner-ups)

Doubles: 2 (1 title, 1 runner-up)

Team competition wins
 2008 – World Team Championship, Düsseldorf, Germany (Clay)

Singles performance timeline

Current till the end of 2015 ATP World Tour.

1Held as Hamburg Masters till 2008.
2Held as Madrid Masters till 2008.

Head-to-head record vs. Top 10 ranked players
Söderling's win-loss record against players who have been ranked World No. 10 or higher is as follows:

Players who are currently playing on tour are marked in bold face.

* Statistics include Davis Cup matches.

Top 10 Wins per season

Wins over Top 10s per season

ATP Tour career earnings

Career Grand Slam seedings
The tournaments won by Soderling are in boldface, while those where he was runner-up are italicized.

References

External links
 
 
 

Soderling, Robin